Finsenfjellet is a mountain in Nordenskiöld Land at Spitsbergen, Svalbard. Its highest peak is 818 m.a.s.l. The mountain is located between Grøndalen and Sassendalen. It is named after Danish scientist Niels Ryberg Finsen.

References

Mountains of Spitsbergen